The Ministry of Foreign Affairs of Estonia is a Cabinet-level governmental agency in Estonia in charge of conducting and designing Estonian Foreign policy.

History 
The Ministry of Foreign Affairs of Estonia was established in 1919 soon after the declaration of independence of Estonia on February 23, 1918. After the occupation of Estonia by the Soviet Union in September 1939 following the Molotov–Ribbentrop Pact in August of the same year.
After establishment of the Soviet rule in Estonia, the Estonian diplomatic corps remained in exile and while a national government in exile was eventually established, the diplomatic corps in exile remained a separate institution throughout the Cold War era and the two institutions did not recognize each other. Both the Estonian diplomats and the government in exile promoted and called for Estonian independence abroad. Among the Estonian Minister of Foreign Affairs in exile were August Rei (1944-1945), Aleksander Warma (1953-1964), August Koern (1964-1982), Elmar Lipping (1982-1990), Olev Olesk (1990-1992). After restoration of independence of Estonia in 1990, the Ministry of Foreign Affairs was reestablished in Tallinn.

See also 
Minister of Foreign Affairs (Estonia)

Sources
Ministry of Foreign Affairs of Estonia

References

 
Estonia
Foreign Affairs
Estonia, Foreign Affairs
1919 establishments in Estonia